Cindy Moreau (born 11 October 1983) is a French paracanoeist. She works as a civilian contract employee for the Ministry of Defence.

References

External links 
 
 

1983 births
Living people
Sportspeople from Angers
French female canoeists
Paracanoeists at the 2016 Summer Paralympics
Medalists at the 2016 Summer Paralympics
Paralympic bronze medalists for France
Paralympic medalists in paracanoe
21st-century French women